The 2007 Queensland round of the V8 Supercar Championship was the seventh round of the 2007 V8 Supercar Championship Series. It took place on the weekend of 20 to 22 July at Queensland Raceway in Queensland.

External links
 Queensland Raceway website

Queensland